Canadian lakes can refer to:

List of lakes of Canada
Canadian Lakes, Ballarat Victoria
Canadian Lakes, Michigan